Qarah Su (also Romanized as Qarah Sū, Qareh Sū, and Qara Su) is a village in Shirvan Rural District, in the Central District of Borujerd County, Lorestan Province, Iran. At the 2006 census, its population was 452, in 116 families.

References 

Towns and villages in Borujerd County